Ernst Julius August Zacher (5 February 1816, Obernigk – 23 March 1887, Halle an der Saale) was a German philologist.

From 1836 to 1839, he studied theology and philology at the University of Breslau, where he attended lectures on German language and literature given by Hoffmann von Fallersleben. He then served as a private tutor under the employ of Graf von Wylich und Lottum. Afterwards, he travelled to the Berlin, where he studied under Karl Lachmann and the Brothers Grimm. In 1847 he began work at the university library in Halle and assumed duties as secretary of the Thüringisch-sächsischen Vereins zur Erforschung der vaterländischen Alterthümer (Thuringian-Saxon Society for the study of Patriotic Antiquities).

In 1853 he qualified as a lecturer at Halle with the thesis, Desquistionis grammaticae de alphabetic gothici ulphilani origine atque indoles particular. In 1856 he became an associate professor, and three years later, transferred to Königsberg as chair of German philology and chief librarian. In 1863 he returned as a professor to Halle, where he gave classes in German grammar, metrics and mythology.

In 1868, with Ernst Höpfner, he founded the journal, Zeitschrift für deutsche Philologie. In 1869 he founded the Germanistische Handbibliothek (German "reference library").

Selected works 
 Das Gothische Alphabet Vulfilas und das Runenalphabet : eine sprachwissenschaftliche Untersuchung, 1855 – The Gothic alphabet of Ulfilas and the Rune alphabet.
 Alexandri Magni iter ad paradisum / ex codd. mss latinis primus, 1859.
 Pseudocallisthenes; forschungen zur kritik und geschichte der ältesten aufzeichnung der Alexandersage, 1867 – Pseudo-Callisthenes; Research on the history and criticism of the oldest record of "Alexandersage".

References 

1816 births
1887 deaths
Academic staff of the University of Halle
Academic staff of the University of Königsberg
Germanists
German philologists
German librarians
University of Breslau alumni
People from Oborniki Śląskie